Ludgate Hill was a railway station in the City of London that was opened on 1 June 1865 by the London, Chatham and Dover Railway (LC&DR) as its City terminus. It was on Ludgate Viaduct (a railway viaduct) between Queen Victoria Street and Ludgate Hill, slightly north of St. Paul's station (now called Blackfriars station) on the site of the former Fleet Prison.

North of Ludgate Hill station, Ludgate Viaduct continued to the Snow Hill tunnel to connect with the then recently opened Metropolitan Railway south of Farringdon station to enable main-line trains to run between north and south London.

Passenger services through the tunnel ended in 1916, after which services ran only the few hundred yards (metres) to Holborn Viaduct station which had opened in 1874. Ludgate Hill became little used because of its proximity to the Holborn Viaduct and St. Paul's stations, and on 3 March 1929 Ludgate Hill was closed. The platform buildings remained derelict until they were demolished in the 1960s but the island platform remained until 1974. Remains of the street-level buildings and traces of the platform and staircase lasted until the whole station area and viaduct were demolished in 1990.

In the 1970s, in the Fleet line proposal, preparatory work began for Ludgate Circus Underground station very near the site of the former Ludgate Hill station, but it was abandoned when a different alignment was chosen for the Jubilee line, as it later became known.

An office building now stands at the site, above a new tunnel which connects the revived Snow Hill tunnel and Blackfriars station for Thameslink services. City Thameslink station, the platforms of which are in tunnel, has its southern exit building on Ludgate Hill, 90 metres north of the centre of the old station.

See also 

 List of closed railway stations in London

References

External links 
 
 

Disused railway stations in the City of London
Railway stations in Great Britain opened in 1865
Railway stations in Great Britain closed in 1929
Former London, Chatham and Dover Railway stations
Former buildings and structures in the City of London